Picture Frame Seduction (PFS) is a hardcore punk band originally from Haverfordwest, Wales, but later jointly based in Cadiz and Málaga in Spain and London and Bristol in the UK. In their formative years in Wales the band was considered too aggressive in their musical style and attitude to book and were continually ignored by established Welsh venues. The band's influences included their peers of the day, Charged GBH and Discharge. With many other bands of the time, such as The Varukers and Chaos UK, they helped develop the hardcore punk scene in the United Kingdom in the early to mid-1980s, recording from 1979 to 1987 on numerous labels.

PFS disbanded in 1987 but reformed in 1999, after being featured on several punk compilation albums in the intervening years.

Releases
Four from the Mountains 1979, 4 track tape cassette release, no label.
Demolition Blues Compilation 1982, Track "Get Your Rocks Off", Insane Records UK. 
"I'm Good Enough For Me" 7" single 1984, So So Records UK. 
The Hand of the Rider 12" album 1985, PFS Records & Rot Records UK. 
In the Clouds Live in Manchester Clouds 1985, no label, 
A Kick up the Arse Compilation 1986, Rot Records UK. 
The End of an Era Compilation 1987, Rot Records UK. 
What You Doing About that Hole in Your Head Compilation  1989, Rot Records UK. 
What's that Hardcore Noise? CD : 2003, Retch Records UK. 
Sex War CD album - CultJam Records: 2005
Fistful of hope CD Compilation: 2005
Stop The Bloody Slaughter - Grand Theft Audio Records USA : Retro full back catalogue 1978 - 86 CD album ; Nov 2006
Skateboarding down Merlins Hill with Penny Harry - CultJam Records ; split cd album ; December 2006
All Grown Up The Movie - Psychopunk Productions New York City ; DVD Film ; Worldwide release January 2008
Bullsheep Detector - All Welsh punk compilation album 1980 - 1984 ; Vinyl ; Anti Society Records worldwide release November 2012
Hand of the Rider - LP vinyl Reissue in USA only on Queer Pills Records, California with extra tracks ; January 2013
Interrupted Piss EP, 7 inch vinyl release on Cider City Records UK : July 2018.
Suicide Run CD album - Violated Records, USA: 2019.
Suicide Run Vinyl album - Violated Records, USA:December 2019. 
 Spirit of DIY Compilation CD album - Punkboot promotions, UK : November 2019. Track "Maximum Rock n Roll"
Fundraising Album for Welsh Music Venues’ CD album - All Systems Go Records, XIII promotions, Track "Sex War" 2020.

Members
Keith Haynes, Robin Folland, Tim Horsley, Jonathon Griffiths (1978–1983)
Keith Haynes, Nigel Drumm, Robin Folland, Tim Horsely (1980)
Keith Haynes, Jonathon Griffiths, Steve Parkin, Mark Bozier (1984–1987)
Keith Haynes, Jonathon Griffiths, Robin Folland, Steve Arthur (2003–2008)
Keith Haynes, Jonathon Griffiths, Ashley Shannon, Steve Arthur (2008-November 2009)
Keith Haynes, Jonathon Griffiths, Steve Arthur, Robin Folland (November 2009 – 2011)
Keith Haynes, Ewen Hyde, Josh Read, Dave Pearce. ( 2016 - 2018 )
Keith Haynes, Mihails 'Mish' Zizkuns, Dave Crisis, Martin Hope, Can Oguz (2019–present)

Further reading

References

External links
Discography Releases from 1982 onwards

British hardcore punk groups
Welsh punk rock groups
Underground punk scene in the United Kingdom
People from Haverfordwest